The 2019 Challenge Trophy (part of the Toyota National Championships for sponsorship reasons) was the 97th edition of the Challenge Trophy, an annual cup competition contested by amateur teams in men's Canadian soccer. Ten teams played in the tournament, which took place from 9–14 October 2019 in St. John's, Newfoundland and Labrador.

Central City Breakers FC won the tournament on their debut, defeating Ottawa St. Anthony SC 2–0 in the final.

Teams 
Each of Canada Soccer's thirteen provincial and territorial associations can send one representative to the Challenge Trophy, with teams generally qualifying through a regional preliminary series such as an open cup or league competition.

For the 2019 tournament, nine provinces and one territory confirmed their participation.

1 Bold indicates champion for that year.
2 Competed in previous tournaments as Winnipeg Sons of Italy.
3 Competed in previous tournaments as Ottawa St. Anthony's Italia FC.
4 Competed in previous tournaments as Dartmouth United Oland.
5 Competed in previous tournaments as Yellowknife FC.

Venues 
Matches were played at four different venues within the St. John's metropolitan area.

Group stage 
Competing teams are divided into two groups of five teams, playing against one another in a single round-robin and advancing to the final round based on their group positioning.

Group A

Group B

Final round 
The final round (known as Teck Finals Day for sponsorship reasons) consists of one game for each team, where they are paired with their equal-ranked opponent from the opposite group to determine a final ranking for the tournament.

Goalscorers

References

External links 

2019 in Canadian soccer
Canadian National Challenge Cup